2-Propanoyl-3-(4-isopropylphenyl)-tropane (WF-31, PIT) is a cocaine analogue which acts as a serotonin-norepinephrine-dopamine reuptake inhibitor (SNDRI). Research shows WF-31 to be approximately ten times more potent than cocaine at binding to the serotonin transporter and at inhibiting its reuptake.

See also
 List of cocaine analogues

References 

Tropanes
Serotonin–norepinephrine–dopamine reuptake inhibitors
Stimulants
Ketones